The First Ladies Summit was officially established in 2010, with Malaysia playing the inaugural host for this biennial event. It aims to gather First Ladies around the world to support a global initiative to ensure a safe and sustainable future for the next generation. The theme of the summit is "A Child Today, A Leader Tomorrow". Despite relatively lukewarm response, UN Secretary General Ban Ki Moon praised the inaugural First Ladies Summit for its efforts in securing the welfare of the children

Meetings
The meetings have been held in:
 First Ladies Summit 1: October 11–13, 2010,  Kuala Lumpur, Malaysia

The original plan was to hold the summit every two years, but its future has been thrown into doubt following widespread criticism of its poor turnout. There is speculation that the event was merely an expensive publicity stunt thrown by Rosmah Mansor to justify her self-styled "First Lady of Malaysia" title — technically such a title cannot exist as Malaysia is a constitutional monarchy, not a republic. Indeed, as of July 2012, there has been no further talk of hosting another summit.

Participation
15 first ladies, six representatives of First Ladies and 21 ministers turned up for the event. List of First Ladies who attended the Inaugural First Ladies Summit are listed as follows. The following list is conjured to be illustrative and not comprehensive.

 Teuta Topi (Republic of Albania)
 Salomea Neves Aim Gomes (Guinea Bissau)
 Ernestina Naadu Mills (Ghana)
 Meme Tong (Kiribati)
 Lorna Golding (Jamaica)
 Keosaychay Sayasone (Laos)
 Sarojini Jugnauth (Mauritius)
 Maria De Luz Guebuza (Mozambique)
 Patience Jonathan (Nigeria)
 Mercedes Lugo De Maidana (Paraguay)
 Natalie Brigitte Nadage Michel (Seychelles)
 Sia Nyama Koroma (Sierra Leone)
 Shiranthi Rajapaksa (Sri Lanka)
 Thandiwe Banda (Zambia)

Controversies
The summit sparked public outcry for its perceived poor attendance. Zuraida Kamaruddin, Member of Parliament for Ampang, criticized the perceived wastage of public funds amounting to 24 million ringgit which she claimed could be put to better use. In addition, Rosmah Mansor's title as First Lady of Malaysia drew ire from certain public quarters, for such a status is not official in Malaysia.

References

External links
firstladiessummit.org - A global initiative for children's education 

ASEAN meetings
Organizations associated with ASEAN
21st-century diplomatic conferences
Biennial events
Recurring events established in 2010